Kiki Bertens and Johanna Larsson were the defending champions, but withdrew from their semifinal match.
Han Xinyun and Christina McHale won the title, defeating Kimberly Birrell and Jarmila Wolfe in the final, 6–3, 6–0.

Seeds

Draw

References
 Draw

Hobart International
2016 Hobart International